Immigration Act (with its variations) is a stock short title used for legislation in many countries relating to immigration.

The Bill for an Act with this short title will have been known as a Immigration Bill during its passage through Parliament.

Immigration Acts may be a generic name either for legislation bearing that short title or for all legislation which relates to immigration.

List

Australia
The Immigration Restriction Act 1901
The Migration Act 1958

Canada
The Immigration Act, 1906
The Chinese Immigration Act of 1923
The Immigration Act, 1952
The Immigration Act, 1976
The Immigration and Refugee Protection Act, 2002

Hong Kong
The Immigration Ordinance 1972

Malaysia
The Immigration Act 1959/63

New Zealand
The Immigration Act 1987
The Immigration Act 2009

United Kingdom
The Commonwealth Immigrants Act 1962
The Commonwealth Immigrants Act 1968
The Immigration Act 1971
The British Nationality Act 1981
The Immigration Act 1986
The Immigration Act 1988
The British Nationality (Hong Kong) Act 1990
The Asylum and Immigration Act 1996
The Special Immigration Appeals Commission Act 1997
The Immigration and Asylum Act 1999
The Nationality, Immigration and Asylum Act 2002
The Asylum and Immigration (Treatment of Claimants, etc.) Act 2004
The Immigration, Asylum and Nationality Act 2006
The Borders, Citizenship and Immigration Act 2009
The Immigration Act 2014
The Immigration Act 2016

United States

The Page Act of 1875
The Immigration Act of 1882
The Immigration Act of 1903
The Immigration act of 1907
The Immigration Act of 1917
The Immigration Act of 1918
The Immigration Restriction Act of 1921
The Immigration Act of 1924
The Immigration and Nationality Act of 1952
The Immigration and Nationality Act of 1965
The Immigration Reform and Control Act of 1986
The Immigration Act of 1990

Others
The European Union Asylum and Immigration Act
The Law No. 2011-672 on Immigration, Integration and Nationality (2011 French Immigration Law)

See also
List of short titles

References

Lists of legislation by short title